The Princeton Tory is a magazine of Conservative political thought written and published by Princeton University students.  Founded in 1984 by Yoram Hazony, the magazine has played a role in various controversies, including a national debate about white privilege.  Notable alumni include United States Senator Ted Cruz and Wendy Kopp, the founder of Teach for America.  Four editors have gone on to be Rhodes scholars.

History

Founding

In the early 1980s, there were several failed efforts to create a magazine with a conservative viewpoint at Princeton University, including the Madison Report, which folded due to financial difficulties.  In October 1984, a group of students including Yoram Hazony of the Princeton class of 1986, as well as Dan Polisar, Julia Fulton (later Hazony), Evelyn Gordon, Amy Bix, Peter Heineke, Ziv Hellman, Ya'akov Menken, Mark Vargo, and Alan Deutschman, began publishing the Princeton Tory, planning for six issues in the initial year.  They felt there was a need for a "thinking journal" to provide a forum for moderate and conservative viewpoints on a campus that was in their view dominated by left-wing politics.  Hazony attributed the failure of the previous attempts at conservative publications to their tendency for sensationalism and mud-slinging.  In contrast, the Tory was founded to highlight cogent argumentation with early issues addressing topics such as religion in politics, the composition of the Supreme Court, and the university's endorsement of a nuclear freeze.

"Pen over the sledgehammer"

In 1986, the Tory found itself in disagreement with future noted conservative Dinesh D'Souza.  At Dartmouth College, student staff members of the conservative Dartmouth Review had taken sledgehammers to a shanty town set up by protesters calling for divestment from South Africa over its Apartheid policies.  D'Souza, a Dartmouth alumnus, in arguing that Princeton would not see similar political violence, was quoted in the Daily Princetonian as saying, "At Dartmouth there is a healthy activism on both the left and the right.  At Princeton, politics masquerades as fashion.  There are more conservatives who are more confident in their actions at Dartmouth.  At Princeton, you only have the Tory, which is too cerebral to be considered."  This critique promoted a response from Tory publisher Dan Polisar: "D'Souza criticized the Tory for being 'too cerebral.'  If that means that we do not favor using sledgehammers as a tool for political debate, then we do not object.  We would rather demonstrate that the problems symbolized by shanties are exacerbated by divestment, as we did in our October issue, than to stage an attack on the symbols themselves...  Campus conservatives are proud of this restraint, and should receive credit, not blame, for choosing the pen over the sledgehammer."

Controversies

Tal Fortgang and "White Privilege"

In April 2014, Princeton freshman Tal Fortgang penned an essay in the Tory entitled, "Checking My Privilege: Character as the Basis of Privilege."  Fortgang wrote the essay in response to being told by a classmate, after expressing his views on welfare and the national debt, to "check his privilege."  He stated, "The phrase, handed down by my moral superiors, descends recklessly, like an Obama-sanctioned drone, and aims laserlike at my pinkish-peach complexion, my maleness, and the nerve I displayed in offering an opinion rooted in a personal Weltanschauung."  The essay was picked up by Time magazine, led to an appearance on Fox News and caused a firestorm of criticism from the left and support from the right.

Fortgang made use of his own family's history, with a grandfather exiled to Siberia, a grandmother sent to the Bergen-Belsen concentration camp, and a great-grandmother and five great-aunts and uncles who were shot in an open grave outside their hometown.  His grandfather and father built a wicker basket business and emphasized education.  Fortgang wrote, "While I haven't done everything for myself up to this point in my life, someone has sacrificed themselves so that I can lead a better life, but that is a legacy I am proud of. I have checked my privilege.  And I apologize for nothing."

Wendy Kopp and Teach for America

Wendy Kopp, the founder of noted educational non-profit Teach for America, has come under some criticism for having been a staff writer for the Tory while a student.  Corey Robin, a fellow member of the Princeton class of 1989, wrote critically of her association with a paper committed, in his view, to the selfishness of capitalism, and some of whose founders, Hazony and Polisar, he describes as "hardcore Zionists" with "storied if peculiar careers on the Israeli right."

Notable alumni

Yoram Hazony, Class of 1986. Founder of the Shalem Center.
Daniel Polisar, Class of 1987. Founder of Shalem College, President of the Shalem Center.
Wendy Kopp, Class of 1989. Founder, Teach for America.
Ted Cruz, Class of 1992. United States Presidential candidate, United States Senator from Texas.
Danielle Allen, Class of 1993. Harvard political scientist, Marshall scholar.
Pete Hegseth, Class of 2003. United States Congressional candidate, CEO of Concerned Veterans for America.
Sherif Girgis, Class of 2008.  Rhodes scholar and co-author, with Robert P. George, of What Is Marriage? Man and Woman: A Defense.
Lawrence Otis Graham, Class of 1985. Author, "Member of the Club",

See also

 Collegiate Network
Dartmouth Review
Cornell Review
Harvard Salient
Stanford Review

References

Magazines established in 1984
Princeton University
Princeton University publications
Student magazines published in the United States
Conservative magazines published in the United States
Bimonthly magazines published in the United States
Magazines published in New Jersey